Tmesiphorus is a genus of ant-loving beetles in the family Staphylinidae. There are about eight described species in Tmesiphorus.

Species
These eight species belong to the genus Tmesiphorus:
 Sintectes carinatus Westwood, 1870
 Tmesiphorus andrewesi Jeannel, 1960
 Tmesiphorus brevipennis Jeannel, 1960
 Tmesiphorus carinatus (Say, 1824)
 Tmesiphorus championi Jeannel, 1960
 Tmesiphorus costalis LeConte, 1849
 Tmesiphorus iyeri Jeannel, 1960
 Tmesiphorus kinomurai Inoue et al., 2019
 Tmesiphorus nitens Jeannel, 1960
 Tmesiphorus okinawensis Inoue et al., 2019

References

Further reading

 
 

Pselaphitae
Articles created by Qbugbot